Cleve Keller and Dave Noll are television show creators, based in New York City. They began working together exclusively in 2007 as Keller/Noll, specializing in game and competition series.

History 
Since joining together, Keller/Noll have created and/or produced dozens of series including: Food Network's Chopped, Chopped Junior, Chopped Champions, Game Show Network's America Says, AMC's Movies 101 and FilmFakers, BarnesandNoble.com's Book Obsessed, BBC America's No Kitchen Required, Bravo's Rocco's Dinner Party, HGTV's Beat the House, Hammered and Don't Sweat It, Lifetime's Your Mama Don't Dance, Oxygen's 50 Funniest Women Alive, TLC's Cover Shot and Yahoo!'s Ready Set Dance!

Their major franchise, Chopped, originally came from a discussion between Noll and Michael Krupat (who they were working with at the time) about the link between the ESPN series Around the Horn and the syndicated series Elimi-Date. "We realized that both of these very different shows had very similar structures," said Noll. "We started calling them '4-3-2-1 Shows' and immediately with Cleve we created four or five different formats based on that same structure. In the next couple of months, we sold one to MTV, one to Court TV, and one to Food Network. The Food Network show was, of course, Chopped."

In 2010, while working for Barry Diller, Diller insisted Cleve and Dave stop creating "just any type of show" and instead focus solely on television formats with global potential. Since then, Keller/Noll has focused exclusively on creating and producing game shows, competition formats, and reality formats.

Keller/Noll series have been produced in Canada, France, Germany, Japan, Spain, South Africa, Turkey, and the United States. In 2012, Chopped won the James Beard Award for Best Television Series and was inducted into the Culinary Hall of Fame.

In 2021, Keller/Noll had signed a first-look deal with Boat Rocker.

Productions

Television series

Television specials

Digital series

References

External links 
 
 

Television show creators